Frank Ealton "Zeke" Wilson (December 24, 1869 – April 26, 1928) was a professional baseball pitcher. He played five seasons in Major League Baseball from 1895 to 1899, for the Boston Beaneaters, Cleveland Spiders and St. Louis Perfectos.

References

External links

Major League Baseball pitchers
Boston Beaneaters players
Cleveland Spiders players
St. Louis Perfectos players
Montgomery Colts players
Easton Dutchmen players
Pottsville Colts players
New Bedford Whalers (baseball) players
Cleveland Lake Shores players
Atlanta Firemen players
Atlanta Crackers players
Montgomery Senators players
New Orleans Pelicans (baseball) players
People from Benton, Alabama
Baseball players from Alabama
19th-century baseball players
1869 births
1928 deaths
Ashland-Catlettsburg Twins players